Louis Delfino (5 October 1912 – 11 June 1968) was a French fighter ace in World War II and a General in the French Air Force.

Delfino was born on 5 October 1912 in Nice. As a boy, his father was killed in World War I. Delfino entered Saint-Cyr military academy in September 1931, graduated, and was promoted to second lieutenant in 1933. He joined the French Air Force and, after earning his wings on 27 July 1934, began his flying career as a reconnaissance pilot. In 1939, shortly before the outbreak of World War II, he joined Groupe de Chasse I/4 (GC I/4) in Reims. GC I/4 was moved to Wez-Thuisy in August 1939, and Delfino, now a captain and adjutant of the unit, saw little action in the opening months of the war.

On 17 May 1940, he was named commandant of the GC II/9's 4th squadron. After the armistice, he rejoined his old group, GC I/4, in Dakar. In August 1943, he became deputy commandant, but the coastal patrol missions did not satisfy his adventurous temperament, so he applied for transfer to the Normandie-Niemen squadron.

Delfino obtained his transfer to Normandie-Niemen on 28 February 1944. He succeeded Pierre Pouyade as the head of the regiment on 12 November. A major in June 1944, he was promoted to wing commander/lieutenant colonel in April 1945. He finished the war with sixteen confirmed victories and four additional claimed.

On 1 January 1946, he became the leader of the 611th wing, composed of only one group – the Normandie-Niemen. On 11 August, he became commandant of the 11th wing upon its return from Indochina. As a colonel in 1951, he was named inspector of the fighter arm the following year. His tenure at this post had an important influence on the regulation and use of fighters. As commandant of defense zone 901 in 1954, he received his first stars in 1957. He then worked with the aerial territorial defense, of which he took command in May 1961. Promoted to air marshal/lieutenant-general in 1964, he became inspector general of the French Air Force.

He died of a heart attack on 11 June 1968, at age 56.

References

Bibliography

1912 births
1968 deaths
École Spéciale Militaire de Saint-Cyr alumni
French Air Force generals
French World War II flying aces